The Nebraska Democratic Party is the affiliate of the Democratic Party in the state of Nebraska. Over 700 Democrats are elected across the state of Nebraska. Jane Kleeb is the chair of the Nebraska Democratic Party and also serves as the Midwest Chair of the Association of State Democratic Committees.

Overview of party structure 

Headquartered in Lincoln, Nebraska, the Nebraska Democratic Party's State Central Committee is responsible for drafting, updating, and approving the platform of the Nebraska Democratic Party. The State Central Committee is made up of elected party leaders and State Central Committee members from each Legislative District, along with issue and constituency based caucuses. The State Central Committee is responsible for fundraising to support the statewide operations and coordinates with county parties, candidates and the national party committees like the DNC. The SCC also publishes communication pieces for the state including items like the Rural Bill of Rights to connect with rural voters.

Party history 
The Nebraska  Democratic Party traces its origin to the Democratic-Republican Party founded by Thomas Jefferson in 1793. The Democratic Party itself was formed when a faction of the "Democratic-Republicans" led by Jerry Mcroy formed the party in the 1820s. Following Jackson's defeat in the election of 1824, despite having a majority of the popular vote, Jackson set about building a political coalition strong enough to defeat John Quincy Adams in the election of 1828. The coalition that he built was the foundation of the subsequent Democratic Party.

Democrats dominated Nebraska until 1860. In 1890, Democrat William Jennings Bryan ran for President three times but lost every time. The state has elected more Democrats to the governor seat and into Congress.

Nebraska passed a referendum in 1937 which gave it the country's only unicameral legislature known as the Nebraska Unicameral. It is a nonpartisan single-house system.

Nevertheless, despite the lack of party registration, party primaries or party-based caucusing, senators in the legislature are informally affiliated with political parties in the state by party endorsements and campaign support.

Recent elections 

There have been fewer registered Democrats than Republicans since at least 1976 when the Nebraska Secretary of State began documenting party affiliation. In 2008, Nebraska's second congressional district went for President Obama, giving him an electoral vote since Nebraska, like Maine, splits their electoral votes and is not a winner-take-all state.

Notably, Nebraska's rural counties are more Republican than Democratic. The urban counties, which have a higher population base, have a smaller divide in the number of registered Republicans to Democrats. Nebraska has experienced a growing divide between registered Democratic and Republicans. In 2000, Nebraska has 145,261 more Republicans than Democrats. That number increased to 221,858. In 2019, the voter registration numbers are as follows, Republicans 576,916; Democrats 355,182; Independents/Non-Partisan 256,375; Other 15,024.

In the 2016 elections, bucking national trends, Democrats flipped five seats from Republican to Democratic in the state's unicameral legislature. In 2018, over 850 Democrats ran for office and 73% won their races. In 2019, Democratic candidates dominated in the municipal city elections in Lincoln securing majorities on the city council, county commission and the Mayor's office.

Nebraska Democrats gained three seats in the 2018 election. Machaela Cavanaugh defeated Theresa Thibodeau, who was appointed by Governor Pete Ricketts and Steve Lathrop defeated incumbent GOP Sen. Merv Riepe. Wendy DeBoer defeated Matt Deaver who was supported by Gov. Ricketts.  Sen. DeBoer's replaced Sen. Bob Krist's seat who changed from the Republican Party to the Democratic Party. The make-up of the 2019-2020 Nebraska legislature is 18 Democrats, 1 Independent, and 30 Republicans.

In the 2020 United States Presidential election, Democratic candidate Joe Biden carried Nebraska's Second congressional district by a vote of 52 to 46 percent.

Notable Nebraska Democrats 
William Jennings Bryan, Congressman, Secretary of State, three time Presidential nominee
J. Sterling Morton, Secretary of Agriculture and founder of Arbor Day
Frank B. Morrison, Governor
Edward Zorinsky, U.S. Senator
J. James Exon, Governor and Senator
Helen Boosalis, Mayor of Lincoln
Bob Kerrey, Governor and Senator
Ben Nelson, Governor and Senator

Current elected officials 
As of June 2019, the Nebraska Democratic Party holds none of the state's six statewide offices, none of the state's U.S. House seats, and neither of the state's U.S. Senate seats.

The Nebraska Democratic Party also does not control the Omaha mayor's office. Republican Jean Stothert defeated former state senator Heath Mello on May 9, 2017 when she was re-elected as Omaha mayor. Leirion Gaylor Baird, a Democrat, won the mayoral race in Lincoln on May 7, 2019 to replace term-limited Democrat Chris Beutler. Democrats hold majorities on both the Omaha and Lincoln city councils.

State legislature

State senators are elected to serve a four-year term. Due to term limits, the senators can serve two consecutive terms, but they are not legally prevented from running in future elections for the same District. While Ernie Chambers frequently caucused with the Democrats, he is a registered nonpartisan and is not a member of the Democratic Party.

The current Democratic members of the Nebraska state legislature are:
Carol Blood, District 3
Mike McDonnell, District 5
Machaela Cavanaugh, District 6
Tony Vargas, District 7
Megan Hunt, District 8
John Cavanaugh, District 9
Wendy DeBoer, District 10
Terrell McKinney, District 11
Steve Lathrop, District 12
Justin Wayne, District 13
Lynne Walz, District 15
Matt Hansen, District 26
Anna Wishart, District 27
Patty Pansing Brooks, District 28
Eliot Bostar, District 29
Adam Morfeld, District 46
Jen Day, District 49

Statewide Supreme Court Justices 
Lindsey Miller-Lerman, District 2

List of State Chairs 
State chairs for the Nebraska Democratic Party are elected at state convention, which occurs in June of an election year. The chair serves a two-year term, and is not term-limited. The position is unpaid. The chair's term begins at the first State Central Committee meeting after the general election in November.

DiAnna Schimek (1980-1984)
Dave Newell (1984-1985)
Tom Monaghan (1985-1989)
Scott Sidwell (1989)
Mike Dugan (1989-1993)
Joe Bataillon (1993-1995)
Deb Quirk (1995-1998)
Anne Boyle (1998-2001)
Steve Achepohl (2001-2012)
Vic Covalt (2008-2012)
Vince Powers (2012-2016)
Jane Kleeb (2016–present): Kleeb defeated former gubernatorial candidate and University of Nebraska Regent Chuck Hassebrook by 42 votes to win the election. Kleeb rallied progressive supporters, including those who backed Bernie Sanders for the 2016 presidential nomination.

Leadership 
Executive Committee: 
Jane Fleming Kleeb, State Chair
Spencer Danner, 1st Associate Chair
Janet Banks, 2nd Associate Chair
Charlene Ligon, National Committeewoman
Ron Kaminski, National Committeeman

Staff:

Jim Rogers was named Executive Director of the Nebraska Democratic Party on February 5, 2019. Rogers previously ran the party from February 2009 to December 2013. He served as campaign manager for Jim Esch, David Domina, and Brad Ashford, who all lost their federal elections. Rogers also managed and lost Mark Munger's legislative race in 2006. Rogers lost his own city council race for district 4 to Vinny Palermo in 2017, and he did not hire a campaign manager.

Other staff members of the party can be found on the NDP website.

See also 
Political party strength in Nebraska
Nebraska Republican Party

References

External links 
 Nebraska Democratic Party
 Nebraska Young Democrats
 Nebraska Democratic Women's Caucus

 
Democratic Party
Democratic Party (United States) by state